The Arch of Triumph is a triumphal arch in Pyongyang, North Korea. It was built to commemorate the Korean resistance to Japan from 1925 to 1945.

Built in 1982 on the Triumph Return Square at the foot of Moran Hill in the North Korean capital city of Pyongyang, the monument was built to honour and glorify President Kim Il-sung's role in the military resistance for Korean independence. Inaugurated on the occasion of his 70th birthday, each of its 25,500 blocks of finely-dressed white granite represents a day of his life up to that point.

Design
The structure is modeled after the Arc de Triomphe in Paris, but is  taller. The arch has dozens of rooms, balustrades, observation platforms and elevators. Inscribed in the arch is the revolutionary hymn "Song of General Kim Il-sung", and the year 1925, when North Korean history states that Kim set out on the journey for national liberation of the country from Japanese rule. Also depicted on the arch is the year 1945, when Korea was liberated.

The arch is illuminated at night and has its own single cylinder diesel generator in case of main power failure.

See also
Korean architecture
Tourism in North Korea
Juche Tower
Kaeson Revolutionary Site
Monument to Party Founding

Notes

References
 Korean Central News Agency of DPRK. link – last accessed on January 19, 2006.

External links

Satellite image from Google Maps
Arch of Triumph picture book at Naenara

 Video from the top

 Video from inside

360° Virtual Tour of Arch of Triumph

Cultural infrastructure completed in 1982
Terminating vistas
Pyongyang
Monuments and memorials in North Korea
Buildings and structures in Pyongyang
1982 establishments in North Korea
20th-century architecture in North Korea